Brigadier Muhammed Zafar Khan  was the first South Asian Commander in the British Indian Army Cavalry.

Khan belongs to the Minhas Rajput clan of Chakwal. His father Raja Fazal Dad Khan was a minor Zamindar (landowner) and was commissioned with a British Indian Army cavalry unit.

Five of Brig Muhammed Zafar Khan's brothers (in total he had seven brothers) joined the Army and became officers. His elder brother, Muhammed Akbar Khan was the first Indian Muslim to become a General in the British Indian Army. His brother, General Muhammad Anwar Khan was the first Engineer in Chief of the Pakistan Army and his brother Major General Muhammed Iftikhar Khan was an officer inherited by the Pakistan Army from British India. He had been nominated to become the first local Commander in Chief of the Pakistan Army after General Douglas David Gracey's retirement. However, his death in a tragic plane crash in 1949 was a disaster for the newly formed country.

References
 Pakistan's Drift into Extremism, Hassan Abbas, 2005
 Pakistani Generals, A. K Anwar, 1992
 Akbar Khan, a biography, Khalid Akbar, 2006.

British Indian Army officers
Pakistan Armoured Corps officers
Indian Army personnel of World War II
People from Chakwal District
1983 deaths
1908 births